Andrei Ivanovich Gorchakov (1768 – 1855) led a Russian infantry corps in the German Campaign of 1813 and the French Campaign of 1814 during the Napoleonic Wars. He participated in the 1799 Italian and Swiss expedition on the staff of his uncle Alexander Suvorov and was at Cassano, the Trebbia and Novi. In 1812 he fought at Smolensk and Borodino. At Bautzen in May 1813 he led the second line of the Right Wing. He commanded the 1st Infantry Corps, at Dresden and Leipzig in 1813 and at Bar-sur-Aube, Laubressel and Paris in 1814.

Footnotes

References

Imperial Russian Army generals
Russian commanders of the Napoleonic Wars
1768 births
1855 deaths